A guilt trip is a feeling of guilt or responsibility, especially an unjustified one induced by someone else.

Overview
Creating a guilt trip in another person may be considered to be manipulation in the form of punishment for a perceived transgression.

George K. Simon interprets the guilt trip as a special kind of intimidation tactic. A manipulator suggests to the conscientious victim that he or she does not care enough, is too selfish or has it easy. This usually results in the victim feeling bad, keeping them in a self-doubting, anxious and submissive position.

There are limited studies examining guilt trips, and those studies tend to focus on guilt trips in parent–child relationships.

See also

References

Further reading
Academic articles
 Baldassar L (2015). "Guilty feelings and the guilt trip: Emotions and motivation in migration and transnational caregiving". Emotion, Space and Society, vol. 16, Aug 2015, pp. 81–89.
 Kezar D (2000). "Shakespeare's Guilt Trip in Henry V". Modern Language Quarterly, vol. 61.3, pp. 431–461.

Books
 Hesz A, Neophytou B (2009). Guilt Trip: From Fear to Guilt on the Green Bandwagon.
 Scottoline L, Serritella F (2014). Have a Nice Guilt Trip.

External links

 Turndorf J (2014) How to Not Get Taken on a Guilt Trip
 Turndorf J How to Stop Getting Taken on Guilt Trips Psychology Today 08 Apr 2014

Guilt